The 1944 North Carolina gubernatorial election was held on November 7, 1944. Democratic nominee R. Gregg Cherry defeated Republican nominee Frank C. Patton with 69.61% of the vote.

Primary elections
Primary elections were held on May 27, 1944.

Democratic primary

Candidates
R. Gregg Cherry, former Chairman of the North Carolina Democratic Party
Ralph W. McDonald, former member of the North Carolina House of Representatives
Olla Ray Boyd

Results

General election

Candidates
R. Gregg Cherry, Democratic
Frank C. Patton, Republican, former United States Attorney for the Western District of North Carolina

Results

References

1944
North Carolina
Gubernatorial